South Carolina Highway 652 (SC 652) is a  state highway in the U.S. state of South Carolina. The highway travels through rural areas of Jasper County. It is known as Calf Pen Bay Road for its entire length.

Route description
SC 652 begins at an intersection with U.S. Route 601 (US 601; Cypress Branch Road) in Pineland. It travels to the east-northeast and curves to the southeast until it meets its eastern terminus, an intersection with US 278 (Grays Highway) at a point north-northwest of Ridgeland.

Major intersections

See also

References

External links

SC 652 at Virginia Highways' South Carolina Highways Annex

652
Transportation in Jasper County, South Carolina